Cueva is a poorly attested and often misclassified extinct indigenous language of Panama. The Cueva people were exterminated between 1510 and 1535 during Spanish colonization. During the 17th and 18th centuries the Kuna repopulated the Cueva area.

Classification
Loukotka (1968) mistakenly identified a Kuna vocabulary from the Darién as Cueva, leading to confusion of Cueva with Kuna in subsequent literature (e.g. Greenberg 1987, Whitehead 1999, Ethnologue 2009), with some authors reporting that Cueva was a dialect of or ancestral to the Kuna language (Adelaar & Muysken 2004:62). The Kuna language and culture are very different from the Cueva.

Loewen (1963) and Constenla Umaña & Margery Peña (1991) have suggested a connection between Cueva and the Chocoan family.

Bibliography
 Adelaar, Willem F. H.; & Muysken, Pieter C. (2004). The languages of the Andes. Cambridge language surveys. Cambridge University Press.
 Campbell, Lyle. (1997). American Indian languages: The historical linguistics of Native America. New York: Oxford University Press. .
 Constenla Umaña, Adolfo; & Margery Peña, Enrique. (1991). Elementos de fonología comparada chocó. In Filología y lingüística (No. 17, 1–2, pp. 137–191). San José: Editorial de la Universidad de Costa Rica.
 Greenberg, Joseph H. (1987). Language in the Americas. Stanford: Stanford University Press.
 Loewren, Jacob A. (1963). Chocó II: Phonological problems. International Journal of American Linguistics, 29 (4), 357-371.
 Loukotka, Čestmír. (1968). Classification of South American Indian languages. Los Angeles: Latin American Studies Center, University of California.
 Romoli, Kathleen. (1987). Los de la lengua de Cueva: Los grupos indígenas del istmo oriental en la época de la conquista española. Bogotá: Instituto Colombiano de Antropología, Instituto Colombiano de Cultura (Ediciones Tercer Mundo).

References

Indigenous languages of Central America
Languages of Panama
Extinct languages of North America
Unclassified languages of North America
Indigenous languages of North America